"Dirty Cash (Money Talks)" is a song by British dance music act the Adventures of Stevie V. It was first released in December 1989 on the Mercury record label, then again in 1990 both on 7-inch vinyl. The 1990 release peaked at number two on the UK Singles Chart, number one in the Netherlands, and topped the US and Canadian dance charts. The song features vocals by Melody Washington, a music teacher from Georgia living in England and teaching for the U.S. Air Force, who met Stevie while she was playing in a local club near his home. Mick Walsh composed the track while Stevie Vincent produced it.

In 1997, "Dirty Cash" was re-released as a remastered '97 remix, and in June 2014, the song was once again remixed, this time by Alan Fitzpatrick. Australian music channel Max included it in their list of "1000 Greatest Songs of All Time" in 2013.

Critical reception 
David Taylor-Wilson from Bay Area Reporter said the song "has all the ingredients for a solid dance hit, with a style somewhat reminiscent of Soul II Soul." Bill Coleman from Billboard described it as a "seductive house track with an underground sensibility sports a tasty vocal hook and top of the chart potential." Another editor, Larry Flick called it "a scathing, house-fueled ode to capitalism". Ernest Hardy from Cashbox called it "a biting-yet-melancholy melding of dance, rap, and R&B that contrasts a hard rap with caressing female vocals." He added, "It's one of the year's best singles, and one of the most misunderstood." Dave Sholin from the Gavin Report wrote that British-based writer/producer Stevie Vincent "spent six weeks Top Ten in the U.K. with this track, selling a quarter million copies in the process—no easy task in that market." He noted it as a "exceptional entry."

Pan-European magazine Music & Media commented: "This is top-rate hiphouse. There is a killer beat, a brilliant chorus, a funky sax, all bound together with a liberal dash of humour. Perhaps more importantly though, it all sounds refreshing and new." A reviewer from The Network Forty stated that the track is "almost a mood piece", and said that it "has a soulful vocal approach backed by a Euro-dance production somewhat reminiscent of the Pet Shop Boys." Pop Rescue said that "Dirty Cash" is "a fantastic slice of 90s music." Miranda Sawyer from Smash Hits labeled the song as "hip-house at its most brilliantly scuzzy. A bump and grind bass and Adamski-like fiddly bit drives this heavy rap and hookline scudding along. Top." Stewart Walker from Toledo Blade noted in his album review, that Stevie V. "blends aspects of both musical forms well [hip-hop and house music] to produce a polished sound that is best illustrated" on "Dirty Cash (Money Talks)".

Chart performance 
"Dirty Cash (Money Talks)" was successful on the charts of several continents. In Europe, it reached number-one in the Netherlands, and was a top 10 hit also in Belgium and the United Kingdom. In the latter, the single peaked at number two in its eighth week on the UK Singles Chart, on May 6, 1990. It was held off the top spot by Adamski's "Killer". "Dirty Cash (Money Talks)" also was a top 20 hit in Austria, West Germany and Switzerland. Outside Europe, it hit number-one on the Billboard Dance Club Songs in the United States. On the Billboard Hot 100, it reached number 25. In Oceania, the single peaked at number 18 in Australia and number 34 in New Zealand.

Track listing

Charts

Weekly charts

Year-end charts

Cover versions 
A remix of "Dirty Cash (Money Talks)" was released in late 2009, mixed by Funk K called "Dirty Cash 2009". "Dirty Cash" was covered by Liberty X, and featured on their 2005 album, X.

"Dirtee Cash", a song recorded by the British grime artist Dizzee Rascal, based on "Dirty Cash", was released as the fourth single from Dizzee Rascal's fourth studio album, Tongue N' Cheek in 2009 and reached number 10 in the UK chart. At the 2010 BRIT Awards, Florence Welch, from Florence and The Machine was joined by Dizzee Rascal to perform a mash-up of her version of "You Got the Love" and his "Dirtee Cash". The mash-up, entitled "You Got the Dirtee Love", was released on 17 February 2010, one day after the BRITs performance.

See also 
 List of number-one dance singles of 1990 (U.S.)

References 

1989 songs
1989 debut singles
1990 singles
1997 singles
British house music songs
Hip house songs
Number-one singles in the Netherlands
Dutch Top 40 number-one singles
Mercury Records singles